German Township is one of the twelve townships of Fulton County, Ohio, United States.  The 2010 census found 6,443 people in the township, 2,097 of whom lived in the unincorporated portions of the township.

Geography
Located in the southwestern corner of the county, it borders the following townships:
Franklin Township - north
Dover Township - northeast corner
Clinton Township - east
Freedom Township, Henry County - southeast corner
Ridgeville Township, Henry County - south
Springfield Township, Williams County - southwest
Brady Township, Williams County - west

The village of Archbold is located in southern German Township.

The fake town of Beatosu was inserted into the 1978-79 Michigan state map in the township as a joke.

Name and history
It is one of five German Townships statewide.

Government
The township is governed by a three-member board of trustees, who are elected in November of odd-numbered years to a four-year term beginning on the following January 1. Two are elected in the year after the presidential election and one is elected in the year before it. There is also an elected township fiscal officer, who serves a four-year term beginning on April 1 of the year after the election, which is held in November of the year before the presidential election. Vacancies in the fiscal officership or on the board of trustees are filled by the remaining trustees.

Attractions

The Goll Woods State Nature Preserve northwest of Archbold, beside the Tiffin River, offers bird watching and hiking through old-growth forest.  Built in the 1860s and 1870s, the Goll Homestead is listed on the National Register of Historic Places.

Public services

Public Schools

Students from the township are served by the following public local school districts:

 Archbold Area Local School District 
 Pettisville Local School District

Mail

Mail is delivered in the township by the following U.S. Post Office locations:

 Archbold, Ohio 43502
 Stryker, Ohio 43557
 Wauseon, Ohio 43567

Telephone

All of the township is within the Archbold telephone exchange, which is served by UTO (United Telephone Company of Ohio,) doing business as CenturyLink, with telephone numbers using the following Numbering Plan Codes:

 419-220
 419-403
 419-445
 419-446
 419-572
 567-444

Electric

Toledo Edison serves most of the township with electricity, with Midwest Energy Cooperative providing to a small area around the Tiffin River north of and west of Goll Woods.

Highways

References

External links
County website
Goll Woods State Nature Preserve Ohiodnr.gov.

Townships in Fulton County, Ohio
Townships in Ohio